Abraham Rotstein (10 April 1929 – 27 April 2015) was a Canadian economist who was a professor of economics at the University of Toronto. He was a fellow of Massey College. He is best known as a co-founder of the Committee for an Independent Canada. He received his doctorate from the  University of Toronto in 1967 for the thesis Fur Trade and Empire: An Institutional Analysis. He was a student of Karl Polanyi.

Rotstein was married for much of his life to Diane, with whom he had two children. After his retirement from the University of Toronto, he came out as gay.

Publications

Articles and addresses
Rotstein, Abraham. "Foreign Ownership of Industry: A New Canadian Approach." The Round Table: The Commonwealth Journal of International Affairs , Vol. 58, No. 231 (July 1968): 260–268. 
Rotstein, Abraham. "Karl Polanyi's Concept of NonMarket Trade," The Journal of Economic History, Vol. XXX, March 1970, pp. 117–26
Rotstein, Abraham. "Canada: The New Nationalism." Foreign Affairs, No. 55 (October 1976): 97–118. 
Rotstein, Abraham. "Is There a Canadian Nationalism?" In Goals for Canada: Walter L. Gordon Lecture Series, 1977–78. Toronto: Canada Studies Foundation, 1978. 
Rotstein, Abraham. "Is There an English-Canadian Nationalism?" Journal of Canadian Studies, Vol. 13, No. 2 (May 1978): 109–118. 
Rotstein, Abraham. "Innis: The Alchemy of Fur and Wheat "Journal of Canadian Studies/Revue d'études canadiennes, Volume 12, Number 5, Winter 1977, pp. 6–31

Books
Rotstein, Abraham. Beyond Industrial Growth. Toronto: University of Toronto Press, 1976  
Review, Canadian Public Policy, Spring, 1978, vol. 4, no. 2, p. 271–272
Review, Contemporary Sociology: A Journal of Reviews, Jul., 1977, vol. 6, no. 4, p. 487–488
Rotstein, Abraham, and Gary Lax. Getting It Back: A Program for Canadian Independence. Toronto: Clarke, Irwin, 1974.    
Rotstein, Abraham. The Precarious Homestead; Essays on Economics, Technology and Nationalism. Toronto: New Press, 1973.    
Rotstein, Abraham, and Gary Lax. Independence: the Canadian Challenge. Toronto: Committee for an Independent Canada, 1972.     
Abraham Rotstein. The Prospect of Change: Proposals for Canada's Future. McGraw-Hill, 1965.      
Reviewed by J R Mallory; International Journal, Autumn, 1965, vol. 20, no. 4, p. 548–549

References 

Canadian economists
Academic staff of the University of Toronto
1929 births
2015 deaths
University of Toronto alumni
Canadian gay writers
21st-century Canadian LGBT people